The 2021 Algarve motorcycle Grand Prix (officially known as the Grande Prémio Brembo do Algarve) was the seventeenth round of the 2021 Grand Prix motorcycle racing season. It was introduced as a response to the COVID-19 pandemic and was held at the Algarve International Circuit in Portimão on 7 November 2021.

In the MotoGP class, Ducati secured its second consecutive Constructors' Championship.

In the Moto3 class, Pedro Acosta won the Riders' Championship after main title rival Dennis Foggia crashed on the last lap after being hit by Darryn Binder. Acosta is also the second youngest rider ever to win a world championship, just one day older than Capirossi.

Qualifying

MotoGP

Race

MotoGP
The race, scheduled to be run for 25 laps, was red-flagged after 23 full laps due to an accident involving Iker Lecuona and Miguel Oliveira.

Moto2

Moto3

 Gabriel Rodrigo withdrew from the event after Friday practice due to persistent shoulder pain.

Championship standings after the race
Below are the standings for the top five riders, constructors, and teams after the round.

MotoGP

Riders' Championship standings

Constructors' Championship standings

Teams' Championship standings

Moto2

Riders' Championship standings

Constructors' Championship standings

Teams' Championship standings

Moto3

Riders' Championship standings

Constructors' Championship standings

Teams' Championship standings

Notes

References

External links

Motorcycle Grand Prix
Algarve
Algarve motorcycle Grand Prix
Algarve motorcycle Grand Prix